Schmid & Partner Engineering AG (SPEAG) — a Swiss company based in Zurich, Switzerland — is a spin-off of the Department of Information Technology and Electrical Engineering (D-ITET) of the Swiss Federal Institute of Technology in Zurich (ETH Zurich). SPEAG develops and manufactures numerical tools and instrumentation to measure electromagnetic (EM) radiation in the near- and far-field at frequencies from static to millimeter wavelengths, producing a variety of products, including for emerging 5G technologies.  The company provides products for testing radiofrequency (RF) radiation emited by wireless devices, serving the wireless communications industry, research and development (R&D) departments, testing laboratories, government agencies, and regulatory bodies, as well as universities and research institutes. Exports account for around 99% percent of company revenues, and about 30% of the annual net revenue is reinvested in R&D.

SPEAG employs 50 – 100 people, and, together with its partner organizations the Foundation for Research on Information Technologies in Society (IT’IS), ZMT Zurich MedTech AG (ZMT), and TI Solutions AG, forms the Zurich43 (Z43) alliance. Z43 shares facilities at Zeughausstrasse 43 in Zurich.

History 
SPEAG was founded on 20 December 1994 by Prof. Niels Kuster, Thomas Schmid, Kurt Schmid, Martin Schmid, Oliver Egger, and Klaus Meier. The main objective of the ETH spin-off was to further develop and commercialize the Dosimetric Assessment SYstem (DASY), a robot-based high-precision EM near-field scanning platform optimized for testing the compliance of mobile communications devices with safety limits.

1995−2004 

In the fall of 1999, SPEAG became one of the founders of the IT'IS Foundation research institute, and remains a major source of the foundation's funding. 

The 3rd generation scanner DASY3 was introduced by SPEAG in 1998, and DASY4 followed in 2002. Also during this period, various physical "phantoms" and tissue simulating liquids for filling the phantoms were developed as models of human anatomy to be used in combination with DASY for testing wireless device safety. In December 2000, SPEAG released the Simulation Platform for ElectroMagnetic Compatibility, Antenna Design and Dosimetry (SEMCAD), a computer-aided design tool for the analysis and design of antennas embedded in complex EM environments. SEMCAD V2.0 was released in early 2003. 

In 2001, the Executive Board of SPEAG founded NFT Holding AG, which purchased all shares from SPEAG's founders.

2005−2014 
Updates to the DASY and SEMCAD product lines continue to be released. SEMCAD X Jungfrau was introduced in 2007, followed by SEMCAD X Matterhorn in 2014. Additional product lines were added: iSAR and cSAR3D for the measurement of specific absorption rate (SAR); ICEy for automated EM near field scanning to evaluate EM compatibility and interference; the Dielectric Assessment Kit (DAK) for dielectric spectroscopy assessments; POsable Phantom for Electromagnetic sYstems Evaluations (POPEYE) whole body and body part simulators for radiofrequency (RF) testing and the Tissue Simulating Liquids (TSL) used to fill the phantoms; optical Time Domain Sensor (TDS) technology for measurements of electric and magnetic fields.

2015− 
Updates to the DASY and SEMCAD product lines continue to be released. Currently, the version DASY8 is combined with cSAR3D-A as DASY8-3D. The latest SEMCAD release, SEMCAD X Matterhorn V20.2, operates on the same code base as Sim4Life, a computational life sciences platform marketed by partner ZMT. DAK-TL for dielectric measurement of materials in thin layers, including small samples of biological tissues or liquids, was launched in 2016. OH4VNA, a miniaturized optical head for cable-free testing of electrically small antennas, was introduced in 2018. In 2020, SPEAG released the Magnetic Amplitude and Gradient Probe System (MAGPy), developed for safety compliance evaluations of wireless power transfer (WPT) systems.

References

External links 
Schmidt & Partner Engineering AG website

IT'IS Foundation website

Zurich MedTech AG website

TI Solutions AG website
Companies based in Zürich
Swiss companies established in 1994
Technology companies of Switzerland

Electrical and computer engineering